Charles Vezin (9 April 1858, Philadelphia, Pennsylvania – 13 March 1942, Coral Gables, Florida) was an American painter.

Life
Vezin was born on April 9, 1858 in Philadelphia, Pennsylvania. He was the son of Charles Vezin and Caroline Vezin, née Kalisky. His younger brother was the painter Frederick Vezin.

On 14 June 1883 he married Adah Delamater (1858–1930) in New York City.

Vezin became a painter at the age of 40. He exhibited his work at the Academy of Fine Arts, the National Academy of Design, and the Corcoran Gallery. He was the president of the Art Students League of New York and the Salmagundi Club.

Vezin had two sons and two daughters. He died on March 13, 1942, in Coral Gables, Florida, at age 83.

References

1858 births
1942 deaths
Artists from Philadelphia
Painters from New York City
American male painters
20th-century American painters
20th-century American male artists